Leon John H. Hutton (August 12, 1906 – January 2, 1969) was an American football player. He played college football for Purdue and in the National Football League (NFL) as an end and halfback for the Frankford Yellow Jackets in 1930. He appeared in three NFL games, two as a starter.

References

1906 births
1969 deaths
Purdue Boilermakers football players
Frankford Yellow Jackets players
Players of American football from Indiana